Shawn Mennenga (born January 8, 1971) is an American football coach. He was the special teams coordinator for the Green Bay Packers of the National Football League from 2019 to 2020. since 2019. After beginning his NFL coaching career with the Cleveland Browns in 2011 under Pat Shurmur after years of college coaching experience. During 2018 Shawn became the special teams coordinator for Vanderbilt before ultimately returning to the NFL.

Playing career
Mennenga lettered one season as a defensive back at the University of Missouri in 1992.

Coaching career

College coaching
Shawn began coaching in the college ranks Mennenga also coached in the collegiate ranks at Southwest Baptist University, first as a  graduate assistant in 1994  and then coaching the team's  secondary from 1995 to 1996. This was followed by Shawn coaching the 1997 season as the outside linebackers coach for Western Kentucky University. He followed this by spending 3 years as the defensive coordinator at Hutchinson Community College in Kansas. He followed this by becoming the defensive coordinator at Culver-Stockton College for the 2001 season. Following the season he received a promotion to become the head coach of the team a position he would hold until 2004. After his head coaching sting Shawn would spend four years at Fort Hays State University as the team's defensive coordinator.  Mennenga spent the 2009–2010 seasons as the linebackers coach at South Dakota State, he helped the defensive improve and lead the team to their first-ever appearance in the Football Championship Subdivision playoffs.

Return to college
In 2018Shawn returned to college becoming the special teams coordinator at Vanderbilt. He helped punter Parker Thome rank 4th in the Southeastern Conference with an average of 44.9 yards per punt on 51 punts, including 14 punts of 50-plus yards and 19 inside the 20-yard line. Thome's average was tied for the fourth best in a season in school history, and he set a single-game school record by averaging 55.3 yards on three punts in Vanderbilt's win vs. Tennessee.

NFL coaching

Cleveland Browns
In , Mennenga made the jump to the NFL and served as the special teams assistant for the Cleveland Browns under Pat Shurmur, a position he would hold for seven seasons (2011–2017). During this time, Mennenga helped the Browns rank No. 7 in the NFL over that span in punt return with an average of 9.9 yards and opponent kickoff return average 21.8 yards. In addition the Browns were the only team in the AFC to earn at least one AFC Special Teams Player of the Week award each season from 2011 to 2016, picking up seven awards over that span of time.

Green Bay Packers
Shawn Mennenga returned to the NFL in  becoming the Green Bay Packers special teams coordinator under first year head coach Matt LaFleur. Mennenga was fired on January 29, 2021.

Head coaching record

Family
Mennenga and his wife, Christie, have a son, Garrett, and a daughter, Ashley.

References

External links
Shawn Mennenga Packers coaching bio
Shawn Mennenga Vanderbilt coaching bio

1971 births
Living people
American football defensive backs
Cleveland Browns coaches
Culver–Stockton Wildcats football coaches
Fort Hays State Tigers football coaches
Green Bay Packers coaches
Hutchinson Blue Dragons football coaches
Missouri Tigers football players
People from Marshall County, Iowa
People from Strongsville, Ohio
Players of American football from Ohio
South Dakota State Jackrabbits football coaches
Southwest Baptist Bearcats football coaches
Vanderbilt Commodores football coaches
Western Kentucky Hilltoppers football coaches